Myanmar (Burma) is a Buddhist majority country with a significant minority population residing in the country. Section 361 of the Constitution states that "The Union recognizes the special position of Buddhism as the faith professed by the great majority of the citizens of the Union."
According to both the 2016 census of the Burmese government Buddhism is the dominant religion, of 88% of the population, practiced especially by the Bamar, Rakhine, Shan, Mon, Karen people and Chinese ethnic groups. Bamar people also practice the Burmese folk religion under the name of Buddhism. The new constitution provides for the freedom of religion; however, it also grants broad exceptions that allow the regime to restrict these rights at will. Ethnic minorities practice Christianity (6.3%, particularly the Chin, Kachin and Karen people), Islam (4.1%, particularly the Rohingya, Malay, Burmese Chinese and Burmese Indian), and Hinduism (0.5%, particularly by Burmese Indians).

Nat worship is common in Myanmar. Nats are named spirits and shrines can be seen around the country, either standing alone, or as part of Buddhist temples. Nat worship has a relationship with Myanmar Buddhism and there is a recognised pantheon of 37 nats.

Census statistics
Note: the figures of Burma's Muslim population is divided into two. One that ignores the people who are believed to be not citizens of Burma and the other that includes them. Without these people in the demographics, the Muslim population will only be as low as 2.3℅ of the whole population of Burma, according to the census conducted by the Burmese Government.

Religion by State/Region

Buddhism is the majority religion in all Regions and Kayin State, Kachin State, Mon State, Shan State and Kayah State. Most Bamar, Shan, Mon, Rakhine, Karen and many ethnic groups of Myanmar follow Theravada Buddhism. Some Chinese people people follow Mahayana Buddhism.

Christianity is the majority religion in Chin State. And There's a significant Christian population in Kachin State and Kayah State. Most Chin, Kachin and Karenni people follow Christianity.

Buddhism 

Buddhism in Myanmar is predominantly of the Theravada tradition, practised by 90% of the country's population. It is the most religious Buddhist country in terms of the proportion of monks in the population and proportion of income spent on religion.

Adherents are most likely found among the dominant ethnic Bamar, Shan, Rakhine, Mon, Karen, and Chinese who are well integrated into Burmese society. Monks, collectively known as the Sangha, are venerated members of Burmese society. Among many ethnic groups in Myanmar, including the Bamar and Shan, Theravada Buddhism is practised in conjunction monastic orders (not to be confused with Nikaya Buddhism) with the most notable being the Thudhamma Nikaya accounting for 87% of Theravada monks. Mahayana Buddhism is practiced less commonly today, often among Chinese. However, Ari Buddhism, a form of Buddhism more related to the Mahayana or tantric traditions, was the dominant Buddhist tradition prior to the 11th century in Upper Myanmar.

Buddhism in Myanmar dates back to at least the third century from contact between what is believed to be the Mon people of Lower Myanmar and Southern Indian kings in Nagarjunakonda. and Tambapamnidipa". Legends and historical accounts written centuries after the fact claim contact as far back as the lifetime of the Buddha, particularly in the traditional account of the construction of Shwedagon Pagoda 2500 years ago. The early Mon and Pyu became flourishing centers of Buddhism in contact with Southern India and Sri Lanka In the 11th century, the Bagan king Anawrahta converted to Theravada Buddhism after his conquests of the region driving out Ari Buddhism and incorporating traditional nats into the new Theravada sect that would become a solid part of Burmese history and culture.

Buddhists, although clearly professed by the majority of people in Myanmar, have their complaints regarding religious freedom. A political party, the Democratic Karen Buddhist Army, split from the main Karen nationalist movement, the Karen National Union (KNU), after the Buddhists were denied to rebuild and repair the stupas at Manerplaw. The top leadership of the KNU were also dominated by Christians, although roughly 65% of the Karen are Buddhist.

Many monks took part in the 2007 Saffron Revolution and were reportedly arrested by government security forces. Some of the leading monks are still detained in various prisons across the country.

Buddhism the fastest growing religion and majority religion in the Myanmar. However, all data about religious demographics is difficult. Although many must list their religion on government forms and identification documents, the number of adherents varies widely from source to source. The constitution provides for freedom of religion but the government imposes restrictions on other religions and grants special preferences towards Buddhism. The Department for the Perpetuation and Propagation of the Sasana and state-sponsored State Sangha Maha Nayaka Committee support and regulate Buddhism in the country. The Committee has the power to disrobe monks who have violated its decrees and edicts as well as Vinaya regulations and laws, and expel monks from their resident monasteries. There is also a deep, mutually legitimising historical relationship between the state and the Sangha (monkhood) with long held inseparability of Buddhism and politics within the country.

Christianity 

Christianity is practised by 6.2% of the population, primarily among the Kachin, Chin and Karen people, and Eurasians because of missionary work in their respective areas. About four-fifths of the country's Christians are Protestants, in particular Baptists of the Myanmar Baptist Convention; Roman Catholics make up the remainder.

Hinduism 

Hinduism is practised by 0.5% of the population. Most Hindus in Myanmar are Burmese Indians.

Hinduism was predominantly pervasive in Burma during ancient times. Hinduism declined after Buddhism was introduced, although some practices and festivals remain part of Burmese culture. Both names of the country are rooted in Hinduism; Burma is the British colonial officials' phonetic equivalent for the first half of Brahma Desha the ancient name of the region. Brahma is part of Hindu trinity, a deity with four heads. The name Myanmar is regional language transliteration of Brahma, where b and m are interchangeable. 

Arakan (Rakhine) Yoma is a significant natural mountainous barrier between Burma and India, and the migration of Hinduism and Buddhism into Burma occurred slowly through Manipur and by South Asian seaborne traders. Hinduism greatly influenced the royal court of Burmese kings in pre-colonial times, as seen in the architecture of cities such as Bagan. Likewise, the Burmese language adopted many words from Sanskrit and Pali, many of which relate to religion. While ancient and medieval arrival of ideas and culture fusion transformed Burma over time, it is in 19th and 20th century that over a million Hindu workers were brought in by British colonial government to serve in plantations and mines. The British also felt that surrounding the European residential centre with Indian immigrants provided a buffer and a degree of security from tribal theft and raids. According to 1931 census, 55% of Rangoon's (Yangon) population were Indian migrants, mostly Hindus. After independence from Britain, Burma Socialist Programme Party under Ne Win adopted xenophobic policies and expelled 300,000 Indian ethnic people (Hindus and Buddhists), along with 100,000 Chinese, from Burma between 1963 and 1967. The Indian policy of encouraging democratic protests in Burma increased persecution of Hindus, as well as led to Burmese retaliatory support of left-leaning rebel groups in northeastern states of India. Since the 1990s, the opening of Burma and its greater economic engagement has led to general improvement in the acceptance of Hindus and other minority religions in Myanmar.

Aspects of Hinduism continue in Burma today, even in the majority Buddhist culture. For example, Thagyamin is worshipped whose origins are in the Hindu god Indra. Burmese literature has also been enriched by Hinduism, including the Burmese adaptation of the Ramayana, called Yama Zatdaw. Many Hindu gods are likewise worshipped by many Burmese people, such as Saraswati (known as Thuyathadi in Burmese), the goddess of knowledge, who is often worshipped before examinations; Shiva is called Paramizwa; Vishnu is called Withano, and others. Many of these ideas are part of thirty seven Nat or deities found in Burmese culture.

In modern Myanmar, most Hindus are found in the urban centres of Yangon and Mandalay. Ancient Hindu temples are present in other parts of Burma, such as the 11th-century Nathlaung Kyaung Temple dedicated to Vishnu in Bagan.

Judaism

Although Burma's Jews once numbered in the thousands, there are currently only approximately twenty Jews in Yangon (Rangoon), where the country's only synagogue is located. The Musmeah Yeshua Synagogue serves the dozen families left as well as Jewish tourists and foreign workers, but not many show up for daily minyan. Most Jews left Myanmar at the commencement of the Second World War, and most of the Jews who still remained in Myanmar after World War II ended in 1945 left the country after General Ne Win took it over in 1962.

Islam 

Islam, mainly of the Sunni group, is practised by 2.1% of the population according to the government census of latest 2014. The Muslim population faces religious persecution in Myanmar. Since independence, successive governments (both democratic and military) did not grant the citizenship of the Muslim Rohingya of Northern Rakhine (Arakan) and forbid missionary activities. The Rohingyas have been forced to flee to neighbouring Bangladesh or to Muslim states. Their claim to citizenship has been marred by disputes with the ethnic Arakanese, who are mainly Buddhists.

Around 800,000 Muslim Rohingyas live in Burma with around 80% living in the Western state of Rakhine. The Military of Myanmar has been killing and driving the Rohingyas out of the country as part of their on and off attempt since the 1940s to create a Muslim-free land in Western Burma.

In the 1970s, uprisings appeared again during the period of the Bangladesh Liberation War in 1971. Recently, the aspiration of the government, according to various media reports, is to create northern part of Arakan an independent or autonomous state.

According to the US State Department’s 2009 international religious freedom report, the country's non-Buddhist populations were underestimated in the census. Islamic scholars claim the country's Muslim population at around 6 to 10% of the total populace. Muslims are divided amongst Indians, Indo-Burmese, Persians, Arabs, and Panthays, the Chinese Hui people.

Main groups
 Muslims are spread across the country in small communities. The British Indian-descended Muslims live mainly in Yangon. See Burmese Indian Muslims.
 Rohingyas, a minority Muslim ethnic group in northern Rakhine State, Western Burma. The Rohingya population is mostly concentrated in five northern townships of Rakhine State: Maungdaw, Buthidaung, Rathedaung, Akyab, Sandway, Tongo, Shokepro, Rashong Island and Kyauktaw.
 Panthay, Burmese Chinese Muslims.
 Muslims of Malay ancestry in Kawthaung. People of Malay ancestry are locally called Pashu regardless of religion.
 Zerbadi Muslims are descendent community of intermarriages between foreign Muslim (South Asian and Middle Eastern) males and Burmese females.
 Kamein

See also

 Burmese folk religion
 Religion in Thailand

Notes

References

External links
 
 2001
 2002
 2003
 2004

 
Burma